Singapore competed at the 2021 Asian Youth Para Games in Manama, Bahrain, from 2 to 6 December 2021. A total of 13 athletes competed in the games.

Theresa Goh is the chef de mission of the delegation.

Competitors
The following is the list of number of competitors in the Games:

Medalist

References 

Singapore 2021
Asian Youth Para Games
Asian Youth Para Games, 2021
Nations at the 2021 Asian Youth Para Games